is the 10th single by the Japanese idol girl group HKT48. It was released on August 2, 2017. The choreographic center is performed by Hana Matsuoka.

The single was number-one on the Oricon Singles Chart and was also number-one on the Billboard Japan Hot 100.

Track listing

Type A

Type B

Type C

Theater version

Personnel

"Kiss wa Matsushikanai no Deshōka? (Senbatsu)" 
The performers of the main single are:
Team H: Kodama Haruka, Sashihara Rino, Tashima Meru, Tanaka Miku, Matsuoka Natsumi, Yabuki Nako
Team KIV: Tomiyoshi Asuka, Tomonaga Mio, Fuchigami Mai, Miyawaki Sakura, Motomura Aoi, Moriyasu Madoka
Team TII: Sakamoto Erena, Matsuoka Hana
Kenkyuusei: Tsukiashi Amane, Toyonaga Aki

"Sakuranbo wo Musuberuka?" 
"Sakuranbo wo Musuberuka?" was performed by 4th Generation members, consisting of:
Kenkyuusei: Unjo Hirona, Oda Ayaka, Sakai Moeka, Shimizu Rio, Takeda Tomoka, Jitoe Nene, Tsukiashi Amane, Toyonaga Aki, Matsumoto Hinata, Miyazaki Sono

"Tonari no Kare wa Kakko yoku Mieru" 
"Tonari no Kare wa Kakko yoku Mieru" was performed by Platinum Girls, consisting of:
Team H: Kojina Yui, Komada Hiroka, Sakaguchi Riko, Tanaka Natsumi
Team KIV: Ueki Nao, Kumazawa Serina, Shimono Yuki, Tanaka Yuka
Team TII: Aramaki Misaki, Hokazono Hazuki
Kenkyuusei: Unjo Hirona, Oda Ayaka, Shimizu Rio, Takeda Tomoka, Jitoe Nene, Matsumoto Hinata

"Gunyatto Magatta" 
"Gunyatto Magatta" was performed by Diamond Girls, consisting of:
Team H: Akiyoshi Yuka, Ui Mashiro, Ueno Haruka, Yamada Marina, Yamamoto Mao
Team KIV: Imada Mina, Iwahana Shino, Fukagawa Maiko, Murashige Anna
Team TII: Imamura Maria, Kurihara Sae, Murakawa Vivian, Yamauchi Yuna, Yamashita Emiri
Kenkyuusei: Sakai Moeka, Miyazaki Sono

"Koisuru Ribbon!" 
"Koisuru Ribbon!" was performed by Murashige Senbatsu, consisting of:
Team H: Akiyoshi Yuka, Kojina Yui, Kodama Haruka, Tanaka Natsumi
Team KIV: Imada Mina, Ueki Nao, Shimono Yuki, Tomiyoshi Asuka, Fukagawa Maiko, Miyawaki Sakura, Murashige Anna
Team TII: Aramaki Misaki, Yamashita Emiri
Kenkyuusei: Oda Ayaka, Takeda Tomoka
Team A: Nakanishi Chiyori

"Romantic Byou" 
"Romantic Byou" was performed by 5 members:
Team H: Tashima Meru, Tanaka Miku, Yabuki Nako
Team KIV: Tomonaga Mio
Team TII: Matsuoka Hana

References 

HKT48 songs
2017 singles
2017 songs
Oricon Weekly number-one singles
Billboard Japan Hot 100 number-one singles
Songs written by Yasushi Akimoto